Genetta plesictoides, also known as the Cypriot genet, is an extinct species of viverrid that was endemic to Cyprus during the Late Pleistocene. It was first described by Dorothy Bate in 1903.

The Cypriot genet was similar in size to the common genet. In comparison to its close living relative, its dental morphology showed adaptations towards a more carnivorous diet.

References

Viverrids
Pleistocene carnivorans
Pleistocene mammals of Asia
Pleistocene extinctions
Prehistoric Cyprus